Hamed Dahane (1946 – 13 July 2020) was a Moroccan football midfielder who played for Morocco in the 1970 FIFA World Cup. He also played for Union Sidi Kacem.

After he retired from playing football, Dahane was a primary school teacher and became an official spokesperson for former club Sidi Kacem.

References

External links

1946 births
2020 deaths
Moroccan footballers
Morocco international footballers
Association football midfielders
Union Sidi Kacem players
Botola players
1970 FIFA World Cup players
Competitors at the 1967 Mediterranean Games
People from Sidi Kacem
Mediterranean Games competitors for Morocco